Rubén Hugo Ayala Sanabria (born 8 January 1950 in Santa Fe, Argentina) is a former Argentine football player and manager, who played as a forward.

Playing career
Born in Humboldt, Las Colonias Department, Santa Fe Province, Ayala played club football for Club Atlético San Lorenzo de Almagro in Argentina where he was part of the team that famously went unbeaten for the whole of the 1972 Nacional championship.

In 1973, he left for Atlético de Madrid in Spain where he won several titles. In 1979, he moved to Mexico to play for Club Jalisco and Atlante F.C.

During his playing career he earned 25 caps and scored 11 goals for the Argentina national football team, and played in the 1974 FIFA World Cup (scoring against Haiti).

He was nicknamed Ratón (Mouse) due to his short height.

Managerial career

After retiring as a player Ayala took up coaching in Mexico he has been manager of Cobras de Querétaro (1986–1987), Tampico-Madero (1987–1988), Cobras de Ciudad Juárez (1988–1989), Correcaminos (1992–1994) and C.F. Pachuca (2000–2005). During his time with Pachuca he guided them to two league titles the Invierno 2001 and the Apertura 2003 as an assistant coach.

Honours

References

External links
 La Liga statistics
 

1950 births
Living people
Argentine footballers
Argentine people of Spanish descent
Argentine emigrants to Spain
1974 FIFA World Cup players
Argentine Primera División players
San Lorenzo de Almagro footballers
Liga MX players
Atlante F.C. footballers
La Liga players
Atlético Madrid footballers
Argentina international footballers
Argentine expatriate footballers
Association football forwards
People from Las Colonias Department
Argentine football managers
C.F. Pachuca managers
Expatriate footballers in Mexico
Sportspeople from Santa Fe Province